The 2006 Australian Drivers' Championship was a CAMS sanctioned national motor racing title open to Formula 3 cars. The title was contested over an eight-round, 16 race series, with the winner being awarded the 2006 CAMS Gold Star. The series was organised and administered by Formula 3 Australia Inc. and was officially known as the "2006 Khumo Tyres Australian Formula 3 Championship for the Australian Drivers' Championship". It is recognised by CAMS as the 50th Australian Drivers' Championship and as the 6th Australian Formula 3 Championship.

British driver Ben Clucas dominated the series driving a Team BRM Dallara F304-Spiess Opel. Clucas won eleven of the twelve races he contested, finishing 52 points ahead of Tim Macrow (Dallara F301-Spiess Opel). Michael Trimble finished third in the points standings, driving a Dallara F304-Renault. Macrow was the only driver to defeat Clucas for a race win before the British driver left the series after Round 6 with an unassailable lead in the points. Macrow also won three of the other four races with Trimble winning the first of the two races held at Queensland Raceway.

Calendar

The championship was contested over an eight-round series with two races per round.

Class structure
Cars competed in three classes:
 Formula 3 Championship: Cars constructed in accordance with FIA Formula 3 regulations that applied in the year of manufacture between 1 January 1999 and 31 December 2004
 Formula 3 National Class: Cars constructed in accordance with FIA Formula 3 regulations that applied in the year of manufacture between 1 January 1999 and 31 December 2001
 Formula 3 Trophy Class: Cars constructed in accordance with FIA Formula 3 regulations that applied in the year of manufacture between 1 January 1995 and 31 December 1998

The relevant FIA Formula 3 regulations were subject to specific amendments for Australian competition, as outlined in the championship regulations.

Points system
Points were awarded on a 20–15–12–10–8–6–4–3–2–1 basis for the first ten positions in each class in each race. One point was awarded to the driver setting the fastest qualifying time in each class for each race and one point was awarded to the driver setting the fastest race lap in each class in each race, but only if that driver was classified as a finisher in the race.

Championship results

References

Australian Drivers' Championship
Drivers' Championship
Australian Formula 3 seasons
Australia
Australian Formula 3